George Islay MacNeill Robertson, Baron Robertson of Port Ellen,  (born 12 April 1946), is a British politician of the Labour Party who was the 10th Secretary General of NATO from 1999 to 2003; he succeeded Javier Solana. He was Secretary of State for Defence from 1997 to 1999, before becoming a life peer as Baron Robertson of Port Ellen, of Islay in Argyll and Bute, on 24 August 1999.

Early life
Born in Port Ellen, Isle of Islay, Scotland, the son of George Philip Robertson (1916–2002), a policeman, and Marion Isabella Robertson Nee MacNeill (1913–1996). His mother taught French and German. His maternal grandfather Malcolm McNeill was the police sergeant at Bowmore during World War One, and wrote about the kindness of local people in shipwreck tragedies of SS Tuscania and HMS Otranto. Robertson was educated at Dunoon Grammar School and studied economics at Queen's College, Dundee. When he was 15 years of age, he was involved with protests against US nuclear submarines docking in Scotland.

During Robertson's time at Queen's College it broke away from the University of St Andrews to become the University of Dundee, of which Robertson was one of the first graduates (MA, 1968), and one of a minority of graduates that year who opted to take a Dundee, rather than a St Andrews, degree. During his time at University he played a full part in student life. He wrote a column for the student newspaper Annasach, launched in 1967, and took an active role in student protests. Robertson used his newspaper column to back the new University and encouraged his fellow students to take a University of Dundee degree (students who had started before 1967 could opt to take a degree from either the University of Dundee or the University of St Andrews).

In 1968, Robertson was one of a number of Dundee students to invade the pitch during a rugby match at St Andrews involving a team from the Orange Free State to protest against apartheid. The same year he organised a 24-hour work-in by students in the university library in opposition to proposed cuts by the government in student grants.

Marriage
Robertson married Sandra Wallace on 1 June 1970. They have two sons and a daughter.

Traffic collision

Robertson survived a serious car crash on 19 January 1976 when a Navy Land Rover, which was carrying  of gelignite and a box of detonators, hit his car head-on in the Drumochter Pass, one mile south of Dalwhinnie leaving him with two injured knees and a broken jaw. In May 1976 the driver of the Land Rover was found guilty of careless driving. Robertson was wearing a seat belt at the time and attributed his survival to this.

Political career
Robertson entered the House of Commons as a Labour MP in 1978, having won the Hamilton by-election in May of that year, caused by the death of the incumbent Labour MP Alex Wilson in March of that year. The seat was contested by a SNP candidate, Margo MacDonald, who came second. Robertson retained the constituency with an increased majority and obtained 51% of the overall vote. He was re-elected to Parliament at five subsequent general elections, was Chairman of the Labour Party in Scotland, and was appointed to the Privy Council.

After Labour won the 1997 general election, Robertson was appointed Secretary of State for Defence. He initiated the Strategic Defence Review, which was completed in 1998, presenting a coherent political and strategic narrative themed as 'a force for good'. The review created the Joint Rapid Reaction Force and inaugurated the ambitious project to build two new large aircraft carriers for force projection, the Queen Elizabeth-class, and its new warplanes, symbolising the new government's commitment to defence.  However the new Labour government had come to power promising to follow the previous Conservative government's spending plans for its first two years, and this required a defence budget cut of £2 billion. Though the defence budget was subsequently expanded, it was not sufficient for the increased ambitions of the review. Tom Sawyer in his book on that government characterised the situation as "Robertson had created an unaffordable dream in 1998."

In 1999, Robertson was appointed Secretary General of NATO after the German defence minister Rudolf Scharping declined to the position, and doubts were raised about the suitability of the British politician and former Royal Marine Paddy Ashdown (at that time the outgoing leader of the Liberal Democrats) due to his never having held a position in government.

In September 2022, during the 7th month of the Ukraine War, interviewed by Channel 4 about his nine meetings with Vladimir Putin, Robertson said, "At the first meeting (in Moscow, Oct 2001) Vladimir Putin clearly said, 'I WANT RUSSIA TO BE PART OF WESTERN EUROPE...at the 2nd meeting (in Brussels) he said..'WHEN ARE YOU GOING TO INVITE RUSSIA TO JOIN NATO?'...I started to sort of reach out and engage them in so many activities that they basically couldn't fight with us.. but after I left NATO (in Dec 2003), the American administration, the Bush administration (during their own illegal war on Iraq opposed by Putin), lost any interest basically in doing business with Russia, they saw it as a threat..they didn't really want to make it part of the overall partnership. I think we missed an opportunity at that time because I think it's what he (Putin) wanted, and we could have grabbed hold of him!"

Quote on devolution
In 1995, Robertson, while he was Shadow Secretary of State for Scotland said, "Devolution will kill Nationalism stone dead". This quote was designed to assuage hopes that devolution would provide a greater platform for the Scottish National Party (SNP). Robertson's quote is frequently recalled, usually in a mocking fashion, since the SNP won Scottish Parliament elections in 2007, 2011, 2016 and 2021.

Dunblane libel action
Robertson's three children are former pupils of the school in Dunblane where gunman Thomas Hamilton murdered 16 children and their teacher in 1996. After the massacre, Robertson, a long-time resident of the town, acted as a spokesman for the victims' families. He was also a key figure in the subsequent campaign that led to the ban on handguns in Great Britain.

In 2003, the Sunday Herald newspaper ran an article entitled "Should the Dunblane dossier be kept secret?", a reference to documents relating to the Cullen Inquiry into the massacre which are to remain classified for 100 years. In a discussion board on the newspaper's website, anonymous contributors claimed that Robertson had signed a recommendation for a gun licence for Thomas Hamilton in his capacity as Hamilton's MP. However, Robertson had never been the gunman's MP, and the claims were unfounded. Robertson sued the Sunday Herald and the paper settled by paying him a five-figure sum plus costs. A subsequent action by Robertson, related to the terms of the newspaper's apology, was unsuccessful. The first case became an important test case as to whether publishers can be held responsible for comments posted on their websites.

Independence referendum interventions
Robertson opposed Scottish independence in the 2014 referendum. In an article in The Washington Post, he wrote: "The residual United Kingdom would still be a major player in the world, but upon losing a third of its land mass, 5 million of its population and a huge amount of credibility, its global standing would inevitably diminish."

He said in a speech to the Brookings Institution on 8 April 2014: "The loudest cheers for the break-up of Britain would be from our adversaries and from our enemies. For the second military power in the west to shatter this year would be cataclysmic in geo-political terms." Robertson also likened the efforts of Unionists to keep Scotland tied to the UK with those of Abraham Lincoln's fight against slavery when he stated, "they might look more relevantly at the Civil War where hundreds of thousands of Americans perished in a war to keep the new Union together. To Lincoln and his compatriots the Union was so precious, so important, and its integrity so valuable that rivers of blood would be spilt to keep it together."

After NATO
Robertson has received numerous honours (including a total of 12 Honorary doctorates from various universities).

In addition, he is a Senior Counsellor at The Cohen Group, a consulting firm in Washington D.C. that provides advice and assistance in marketing and regulatory affairs.

Football
Robertson is a supporter of Hamilton Academical.

Career
 1968–1978, Official of the GMB Union for the Scottish whisky industry.
 1978–1999, Member of the British House of Commons, member for Hamilton or Hamilton South, elected six times.
 1979, Parliamentary Private Secretary to the Secretary of State for Social Services.
 1979–??, Opposition Spokesman on Scottish Affairs.
 19??–82, Opposition Spokesman on Defence.
 1982–93, Opposition Spokesman on Foreign Affairs.
 1983–93, Chief Opposition Spokesman on Europe.
 1993–97, Shadow Secretary of State for Scotland.
 May 1997, Appointed to the Privy Council
 May 1997 – October 1999, Defence Secretary of the United Kingdom
 October 1999 – January 2004, 10th Secretary General of NATO and Chairman of the North Atlantic Council.

Other former or present posts
 Chairman of the Labour Party in Scotland
 Vice-chairman of the Westminster Foundation for Democracy
 Vice-chairman of the British Council for nine years
 Vice-chairman of the Britain-Russia Centre
 Member of the Council of the Royal Institute of International Affairs (Chatham House) seven years, now President
 Member of the Pilgrims Society
 Governor of the Ditchley Foundation
 Trustee of the 21st Century Trust
 Patron to the British-American Project
 Currently serves on the board of Cable & Wireless International
 Currently serves on the board of The Weir Group PLC
 Currently serves on the board of The TNK-BP
 Currently serves on the Global Panel Foundation|Global Panel America Advisory Board
 Currently a member of the Top Level Group of UK Parliamentarians for Multilateral Nuclear Disarmament and Non-proliferation, established in October 2009.
 Hon president of the Clan Donnachaidh Society

Honours and awards
Orders
 2003 Knight Grand Cross of the Order of St Michael and St George (GCMG)
 30 November 2004 Knight of the Order of the Thistle (KT)

Foreign Honours
 1991 Grand Cross of the Order of Merit of the Federal Republic of Germany
 2000 Grand Cross of the Order of the Star of Romania
 8 September 2003 Knight Grand Cross of the Order of Orange-Nassau
 12 November 2003 Presidential Medal of Freedom
 1 December 2003 – Grand Order of King Petar Krešimir IV 
 2004 Knight Grand Cross of the Order of the Cross of Terra Mariana
 1 July 2016 Order of St. George

Organisation
 1993 joint Parliamentarian of the Year for his role in the Maastricht Treaty ratification
 2000 Golden Plate Award of the American Academy of Achievement presented by General Joseph Ralston, USAF, Supreme Allied Commander Europe.
 2003 Atlantic Solidarity Award bestowed by the Manfred Wörner Foundation
 4th recipient of the Hanno R. Ellenbogen Citizenship Award
 Elder Brother of Trinity House

Appointments
 24 August 1999 life peer as Baron Robertson of Port Ellen

Appointments
Personal
  Member of the Privy Council of the United Kingdom (PC)

Fellowships
 Fellow of the Royal Society of Arts (FRSA)
 Fellow of the Royal Society of Edinburgh (FRSE)

Academic
 5 July 2006 Honorary Degree of Doctor of the University (DUniv) from the University of Paisley.
 Honorary Doctorate from the University of Dundee
 Honorary Doctorate from the University of Bradford
 Honorary Doctorate from Cranfield University (Royal Military College of Science)
 Honorary Doctorate from the Baku State University

Honorary military appointments
Appointments
  Honorary Regimental Colonel of the London Scottish (Volunteers)

References

External links

 Lord Robertson of Port Ellen profile, www.parliament.uk
 
 NATO Declassified – Lord Robertson (biography)

|-

|-

|-

|-

1946 births
London Scottish officers
Living people
Alumni of the University of Dundee
Fellows of the Royal Society of Edinburgh
GMB (trade union)-sponsored MPs
Knights of the Thistle
Labour Party (UK) life peers
Scottish Labour MPs
Members of the Privy Council of the United Kingdom
People educated at Dunoon Grammar School
People from Islay
People from Port Ellen
Secretaries General of NATO
Secretaries of State for Defence (UK)
UK MPs 1974–1979
UK MPs 1979–1983
UK MPs 1983–1987
UK MPs 1987–1992
UK MPs 1992–1997
UK MPs 1997–2001
Grand Crosses of the Order of the Star of Romania
Members of Trinity House
Life peers created by Elizabeth II